Betty Astell (23 May 1912 – 26 July 2005), born Betty Julia Hymans, was an English actress, best known for comedy and pantomime productions on stage, screen, and radio with her husband, Cyril Fletcher. She was one of the first performers to appear on television, in experimental broadcasts by the BBC in 1932.

Early life 
Betty Julia Hymans was born in Brondesbury, Willesden, Middlesex, the daughter of Herbert Hyams and Estella Oppenheimer Hyams.

Career

Radio 
Astell was a child performer, trained as a dancer. She sang on BBC Radio programmes in the 1920s, and met her husband while making recordings for radio in Bristol during World War II. In 1956 and 1957, they played a married couple in a radio comedy, Mixed Doubles, written by Bob Monkhouse and Denis Goodwin.

Television 
In 1931 and 1932, Astell sang and danced in John Logie Baird's experimental television programming, on the BBC's 30-line shows, making her one of the first people to perform on television. That same year, she played Alice in Dick Whittington, the first televised pantomime. She starred with her husband on an early sketch show for television, Kaleidoscope (1949), and on his eponymous television series, The Cyril Fletcher Show, on ITV beginning in 1959.

Stage and film 
Astell's made her London stage debut in John Galsworthy's Escape (1928). She performed in revues through the 1940s, including Magic Carpet (1943) and Keep Going (1944).

Astell first appeared in film in 1932, in A Tight Corner with Frank Pettingell. She stayed active in film through the 1930s, appearing in two dozen films. In 1942, the Fletchers were familiar enough to a wide audience to make a wartime newsreel clip together, honouring farmers. Her last film role came in 1948, when she returned to the screen in A Piece of Cake, co-starring with her husband.

Astell also wrote and produced pantomimes at the Ashcroft Theatre in Croydon, including Dick Whittington, Mother Goose, Sleeping Beauty, Cinderella, and Aladdin.

Personal life 
Astell was married to entertainer Cyril Fletcher for more than 60 years, from 18 May 1941 until his death on 1 January 2005. They had a daughter, actress/comedian Jill Fletcher, born in 1945. Astell died in a hospital near her home in Guernsey, aged 93 years, nearly seven months after the death of her husband.

Filmography

Film

Television

References

External links

Betty Astell at British Comedy Guide
A 1971 portrait of Betty Astell, at Getty Images
The Fairfield Collection at the Museum of Croydon includes several flyers for pantomimes starring Fletcher and Astell.

1912 births
2005 deaths
English film actresses
English television actresses
Actresses from London
People from Kilburn, London
20th-century English actresses
20th-century British businesspeople